Lakhimpur may refer to:

 Lakhimpur district, in Assam, India
 North Lakhimpur, a city
 Lakhimpur Kheri district, Uttar Pradesh, India
 Lakhimpur, Uttar Pradesh, a city